Unione Sportiva Follonica Gavorrano is an Italian association football club that represents the municipalities of Follonica and Gavorrano in Tuscany, the latter is also the company headquarters.

The club currently play in Serie D, the fourth tier of Italian football.

History
The club was founded on 1930.

In the season 2009–10 it was promoted from Serie D to Lega Pro Seconda Divisione. The club was relegated back to Serie D after the 2013-14 season after only avoiding a relegation in the previous campaign in order to fill vacancies in the division. The club subsequently earned promotion to Serie C as Group E champions of the 2016–17 Serie D season.
In June 2019 the merger between the company of Follonica and that of Gavorrano was made official: the new team, heir of the Gavorrano sporting tradition takes the name of Follonica Gavorrano and is admitted in Serie D.

Colors and badge
The colors of the club are white, blue and red.

Famous presidents

Mario Matteini
On 9 March 2011 died Mario Matteini, the historic president who led the club from Seconda Categoria to Lega Pro Seconda Divisione, from 1999 to 2011.

Honours
 Coppa Italia Serie D
Champions (1): 2021–22

References

External links
Official website 

Serie C clubs
Association football clubs established in 1930
Football clubs in Tuscany
1930 establishments in Italy
Follonica
Gavorrano